Bruno Hamm,  is a former French professional basketball player. At a height of 1.85 m (6'1") tall, he played at the point guard position.

Professional career
Hamm was the French 2nd Division French Player's MVP in 1994.

Clubs 

 2000–2001: Cáceres CB (Liga ACB)
 2001–2004: Jeanne d'Arc Dijon Bourgogne (Pro A)

References

 

1970 births
Living people
Élan Béarnais players
French men's basketball players
JDA Dijon Basket players
Liga ACB players
Limoges CSP players
Orléans Loiret Basket players
SIG Basket players
Sportspeople from Strasbourg
Point guards